TV 2 Charlie is a Danish television channel owned by TV 2. It was launched on 1 October 2004. The channel shows own productions and British criminal dramas (like Dalziel and Pascoe, A Touch of Frost and Silent Witness.) 
It broadcasts from 8:00 in the afternoon to 02:00 in the night, and is available by digital antenna (DVB-T/T2 & MPEG4), cable and satellite. In recent years programming airs almost continually, with only a short break in the deep hours of the night around 4:00. The channel is funded by usage fees and advertising.
The commercials appear between the programmes only.

On satellite, TV 2 Charlie (as well as TV 2 Zulu and TV 2 Film) was initially exclusively available via Canal Digital. The competing Viasat platform started broadcasting the channels in January 2009.

Notable programs 
 A Touch of Frost
 All Creatures Great and Small
 Chicago Hope
 Dallas
 Dalziel and Pascoe
 Heartbeat
 Inspector Rex
 Keeping Up Appearances
 New Tricks
 NYPD Blue
 Silent Witness
 The Benny Hill Show
 The Bill

References

External links
 Official site of TV2 Charlie

Television stations in Denmark
Television channels and stations established in 2004